The Golden Path is a point-and-click adventure video game published in 1986 by Firebird Software. The game's player character is Y'n Hsi, a Chinese Bhikkhu (Buddhist monk) and nobleman. Y'n Hsi seeks to depose Ch'un Kuei, a tyrannical warlord who murdered Y'n Hsi's father.

References

External links
 The Golden Path at Lemon Amiga
 The Golden Path at Atari Mania

1986 video games
Amiga games
Atari ST games
Point-and-click adventure games
Telecomsoft games
Video games developed in the United States